Bidhannagar Municipal Corporation is the local government responsible for the civic infrastructure and administration of Salt Lake and Rajarhat areas in Greater Kolkata. 
  
Bidhannagar Municipal Corporation was headed by Administrator Pawan Kadyan, IAS till elections were held in October 2015 after delimitation into 41 wards (Ward No.s 1 to 26 from Rajarhat-Gopalpur Municipality, Ward No. 27 from Mahishbathan II Gram Panchayat and Ward No.s 28 to 41 from Bidhannagar Municipality). This constituted its first Board of Councillors and Mayor-in-Council with Pawan Kadyan, IAS transitioning into the role of Municipal Commissioner. BMC consists of 41 wards (grouped in 6 boroughs). The Corporation is under administrative jurisdiction of Bidhannagar subdivision in the district of North 24 Parganas and police jurisdiction of Bidhannagar City Police. The current Municipal Commissioner is Sujay Sarkar, IAS, who has been in the post since 29 April 2022.

Geography
The jurisdiction of BMC includes Salt Lake (a planned satellite town of Kolkata and previously under "Bidhannagar Municipality"), Mahishbathan II Gram Panchayat (which consisted of Tarulia, Mahisgote and Thakdari) and Rajarhat (previously under "Rajarhat-Gopalpur Municipality" which consisted of Kestopur, Chandiberia,  Baguiati, Udayan Pally, Santosh Pally, Jagatpur, Ashwini Nagar, Narayantala, Raghunathpur, Arjunpur, Teghoria, Jyangra, Helabottala, Noapara, Adarsha Pally, Pramodgarh, Jyoti Nagar, Hatiara, Kaikhali, Chinar Park, Atghara, Dasadrone, Salua, Bablatala, Narayanpur, Beraberi, Bidisha Pally, Sarada Pally, Ganti and part of NSCBI Airport).
Bidhannagar Municipal Corporation borders Madhyamgram Municipality in the north, Rajarhat block in the south, New Town in the east and South Dum Dum in the west

Administration
Bidhannagar Municipal Corporation is divided into 41 wards. The 41 wards are arranged into 6 boroughs. Each ward elects a councillor. The mayor is responsible for the overall functioning of the BMC and has a tenure of five years. At present, the All India Trinamool Congress holds the power in the BMC.

Budget

Demographics
As per 2011 census, total population under Bidhannagar Municipal Corporation is 632,107. Total number of Scheduled Castes and Scheduled Tribes are 121,761 and 10,950 respectively. Among the 41 wards, Wards no 20 has the highest population with 20,981 residents while ward no 23 has the lowest population with 11,639 residents. Total number of households in BMC is 153,661.

List of mayors

References

External links
 

Politics of North 24 Parganas district
Municipal corporations in West Bengal
Organisations based in Kolkata
2015 establishments in West Bengal